The Victorian Railways G class is a class of steam locomotives built for the Victorian Railways 2 ft 6 in gauge branch lines by Beyer, Peacock & Company. They were introduced in 1926 to increase train sizes, eliminate the practice of double heading NA locomotives and reduce losses on these lines. Their tractive effort was comparable to the most powerful branch line locomotives on the Victorian Railways , the K class.

Origins

The design was based on the earlier M and Ms class Garratts constructed for the Western Australian Government Railways. This design was amongst the earliest of the Garratts, and first entered service in 1911. The design proved durable as two further examples were built for the Australian Portland Cement 3 ft 6 in gauge railway at Fyansford in the 1930s.

Working lives
The locomotives were allocated numbers G41 and G42. G41 was put to work on the Colac to Beech Forest and Crowes line, while G42 was placed on the Moe to Walhalla railway. The locomotives stayed on these lines, returning to Newport Workshops for heavy repairs when necessary. After the closure of the Walhalla line in 1955, G42 was moved west to Colac, where it worked the line in conjunction with G41. At the closure of this line in 1962, only G42 was considered to be in operational condition, G41 was mostly cannibalised for parts to be used in G42.

Disposal and preservation
After closure both locomotives were removed to the Newport Workshops, and G41 was quickly scrapped in October 1964, the number plates, whistle and headlights were recovered and are housed at the Menzies Creek Museum. G42 was bought from the Victorian Railways in July 1964 by the Puffing Billy Preservation Society, it was transferred by rail to Belgrave in January 1968 and finally arrived at the Menzies Creek Steam Museum on 10 February 1968. The museum also acquired one of the Australian Portland Cement Garratts along with an unused spare boiler. In 1978 a decision was made to restore G42, a task that was completed in April 2004. The spare boiler from Australian Portland Cement was used instead of G42's original boiler as this had had its copper inner fire-box and boiler tubes removed by the V.R. before sale to the Puffing Billy Preservation Society in 1963.

G42 was withdrawn from service in February 2009 pending a "D" exam as part of the Puffing Billy Railway's regular maintenance program. On 16 August 2009, G42 returned to service for one day only to celebrate "100 years of the Garratt locomotive design" with a special to Cockatoo and return before returning to storage pending the mentioned "D" exam.

On 12 December 2010, G42 moved under its own steam after extensive repairs including turning more than 1" from the wheel tyres. It was put to a test with a difficult shunt of 20 cars into different roads. The locomotive is now used on the "Green time table" service which otherwise calls for the double heading of NA class locomotives on one of the trips, enabling its greater hauling capacity to substitute for the two NAs.

As of August 2015, G42 is still currently operating on a regular basis. It will only operate on weekends, special occasions (Public holidays, etc.) or if there is a shortage of NAs on running days not covered by the days stated above.

This running schedule was devised in an attempt to prolong G42s service life mainly due to the tire wear caused by the locomotive design and tight curves of the railway.

References

Further reading

External links

Garratt locomotives
G class
Beyer, Peacock locomotives
2 ft 6 in gauge locomotives
2-6-0+0-6-2 locomotives
Railway locomotives introduced in 1926